Roland Rasel Bilala (born 16 December 1990 in Zaporizhia) is a Ukrainian professional association football player who currently plays as a striker and last played for Minerva Punjab FC in the I-League.

Club career
Bilala began his senior club career with FC Dynamo-3 Kyiv in 2007.  He has also played for Dynamo Kyiv (reserves). In Summer 2011, he moved to the Moldovan National Division side FC Tiraspol. He appeared in 20 matches for the club, scoring 3 goals.

In 2013, he signed with  UkrAhroKom Holovkivka and played 4 matches in the Ukrainian First League before moving to an amateur side Igros Krasnobród. In 2015, he came back to professional football with Ukrainian Second Division outfit FSC Bukovyna Chernivtsi. He played 13 league matches for the side, scoring 3 goals. In December 2015, he signed for another Ukrainian side NK Veres Rivne but has not played any league match.

In the 2016–17 Ukrainian First League, he played for Skala Stryi and scored 3 goals in 21 matches. At the end of the league, Skala Stryi relegated after finishing 17th and Bilala signed for FC Ternopil. But it was not a suitable stint in his career and he moved to Lithuania in 2017.

Bilala joined Lithuanian A Lyga side FK Panevėžys on one year deal. With FK Panevėžys, he played in the 2017-18 A Lyga. He scored 4 goals in 15 league matches before moving to Maldivian Dhivehi Premier League outfit Club Green Streets. He scored four goals in a match against giants New Radiant S.C. in November 2018.

In 2019, Bilala signed for I-League side Minerva Punjab FC of India. He debuted for the club in the AFC Champions League (prilimenary round) qualification match against Saipa FC of Iran. He has also appeared in 3 league matches and scored 1 goal against Chennai City FC on 9 March.

International career
In 2006, Bilala was called up in the squad of Ukraine U-17 team and appeared in 6 matches until 2007.

Career statistics

Club

Personal life
He was born in Zaporizhzhia, a city in the south-eastern Ukraine. His father is of Congolese descent and his mother is Ukrainian.

See also
 Ukrainian expatriate footballers

References

External links
 
 

1990 births
Living people
Footballers from Zaporizhzhia
Ukrainian footballers
FC Dynamo-3 Kyiv players
FC Tiraspol players
FC UkrAhroKom Holovkivka players
FC Bukovyna Chernivtsi players
NK Veres Rivne players
FC Skala Stryi (2004) players
FC Ternopil players
FK Panevėžys players
Club Green Streets players
RoundGlass Punjab FC players
I-League players
Ukrainian expatriate footballers
Expatriate footballers in Moldova
Expatriate footballers in Poland
Ukrainian people of Democratic Republic of the Congo descent
Association football forwards